Sítio do Picapau Amarelo may refer to:

 Sítio do Picapau Amarelo (novel series), a Brazilian children's fantasy novel series written by Monteiro Lobato
 Sítio do Picapau Amarelo (fictional farm), the primary setting for the children's fantasy novel series
 Sítio do Pica-pau Amarelo (1952 TV series), a 1952 Brazilian television series based on the novel series of the same title
 Sítio do Picapau Amarelo (1977 TV series), a 1977 Brazilian television series based on the novel series of the same title
 Sítio do Picapau Amarelo (2001 TV series), a 2001 Brazilian television series based on the novel series of the same title
 Sítio do Picapau Amarelo (2012 TV series), a 2012 Brazilian animated television series based on the novel series of the same title
 Sítio do Picapau Amarelo (comics), a Brazilian comics series based on the novel series of the same title
 Sítio do Picapau Amarelo (video game), a 1997 video game developed by Tectoy based on the novel series of the same title